The Fire Coward is a 1913 American short silent film drama. The film starred Earle Foxe, Irene Boyle, Stuart Holmes, and James B. Ross in the lead roles.

External links

American silent short films
1913 drama films
1913 films
American black-and-white films
Kalem Company films
1913 short films
Silent American drama films
1910s American films